FK Iecava is Latvian football club located in Bauska.

Players

First-team squad

Iecava

References